[Claude-]Antoine Clériadus de Choiseul-Beaupré (29 September 1707 – 7 January 1774) was a cardinal of the Roman Catholic Church.

He was made vicar-general of Mende in 1733. As a member of the important family of Choiseul, he was Grand Aumônier to Stanisław Leszczyński, titular king of Poland, at his court at Nancy, Lorraine, from 1742, in which year he was promoted to Primate of the church of Lorraine.  He was elected archbishop of Besançon, 17 March 1755, and raised to the cardinalate by Pope Clement XIII in the consistory of 23 November 1761. Choiseul de Beaupré, usually styled the Cardinal de Choiseul, participated in the conclave of 1769 that elected Pope Clement XIV.

The younger son of Antoine-Clériadus, comte de Choiseul, marquis de Beaupré, seigneur de Daillecourt (1664—1726) he was born at the family château of Daillecourt (Haute-Marne ), in the diocese of Langres, France. He studied theology at the University of Paris. He carried the French court sinecure of Aumônier du Roi from 1736. He died in Paris and is buried in his cathedral of Besançon.

The name was also carried by his namesake, Claude-Antoine-Clériadus de Choiseul-Beaupré (1733 — 1794), created prince de Choiseul-Beaupré.

Notes

18th-century French cardinals
1707 births
1774 deaths
Burials at Besançon Cathedral